From December 2007 to the beginning of 2016, DB Bahn was one of three brands of Deutsche Bahn alongside DB Schenker and DB Netze.

It included all DB mobility services and was dissolved in 2015 as part of a reorganisation of the DB Group brands.

References 

Deutsche Bahn